HMS Blazer is an  of the Royal Navy. She was built by Vosper Thornycroft. The ship is based at HMS Nelson, the shore base in Portsmouth and was commissioned in 1988.

Blazer carries a crew of four, plus a commanding officer. A training officer accompanies up to 10 students when Blazer is operating in its URNU capacity. The ship is affiliated to both the Southampton University Royal Naval Unit (SURNU) and Portsmouth University Royal Naval Unit.

Tasking includes: officer cadet training with Britannia Royal Naval College; VVIP visits and security patrols.

On 29 March 1993 Blazer was involved in a fishing incident with French trawlers at the port of Cherbourg. According to witnesses, Blazer was seized by French fisherman while manoeuvring outside the port and sailed to Cherbourg harbour. Her crew of 16 were forced to remain below the deck for three hours, while the ship's White Ensign was burned. French authorities subsequently put an end to the situation and forcibly expelled the fishermen from Blazer and placed them under arrest. The French Navy, meanwhile, dispatched the patrol boat Coriander to Cherbourg to restore order.

Notes

References

External links

 

Blazer